Herbi Felsinger (4 June 1934 – 29 April 2018) was a Sri Lankan cricket umpire. He stood in six Test matches between 1982 and 1986 and eleven ODI games between 1982 and 1986, including Sri Lanka's first Test match in February 1982.

See also
 List of Test cricket umpires
 List of One Day International cricket umpires

References

1934 births
2018 deaths
People from Colombo
Sri Lankan Test cricket umpires
Sri Lankan One Day International cricket umpires